Samuel Walter Ellison (27 August 1923 – December 1994) was an English professional footballer who played as a winger for Sunderland.

References

1923 births
1994 deaths
People from Leadgate, County Durham
Footballers from County Durham
English footballers
Association football wingers
Sunderland A.F.C. players
Consett A.F.C. players
Reading F.C. players
Brighton & Hove Albion F.C. players
English Football League players